Carlos Casas is a filmmaker and artist whose practice encompasses film, sound and the visual arts. His films have been screened and awarded in festivals around the world, like the Venice Film Festival, International Film Festival Rotterdam, Buenos Aires International Film Festival, Mexico International Film Festival, CPH DOX Copenhagen, FID Marseille, etc... Retrospectives of his films have been presented international festivals and cinematheques from Madrid, Mexico to Bruxelles, his work has been exhibited and performed in international art institutions and galleries, such as Tate Modern in London, Fondation Cartier, Palais de Tokyo, Centre Pompidou in Paris, NTU CCA Singapore; Hangar Bicocca, and La Triennale in Milan, CCCB Barcelona, Matadero Madrid,  Museo Nacional Centro de Arte Reina Sofía Madrid, MAAT Lisbon, GAM Torino, Bozar, Kunsten Festival des Arts Bruxelles … among others.  He has collaborated with musicians and artists like Phill Niblock, Z'EV, Nico Vascellari, Prurient, Sebastian Escofet, Nastro Mortal.

Biography
Carlos Casas studied fine arts, cinema and design. In 1998 he was awarded an Artist-in-residence in Fabrica, research and communication center of Benetton. In 2000 his short Film “Afterwords”, produced by Marco Müller and Fabrica Cinema was selected for Venice Film Festival, International Film Festival Rotterdam  and Reencontres du Cinema in Paris 2001. In 2001 he started a series of documentaries for Colors Magazine, and a series of Fieldworks, an ongoing experiment with ambiental video and radio frequencies, a sort of landscape video notes, in 2003 he developed a 52 min documentary,”Rocinha. Daylight of a favela” Shot on location in one of the biggest favelas in Rio de Janeiro.He also publish a compilation of Funk Carioca in collaboration with DJ Marlboro and Irma Records. In 2004 he finished “Aral. Fishing in an invisible sea” about the life of the three remaining generation of Fishermen in the Aral sea, which won the best documentary award in Torino Film festival 2004, and was selected for the International Film Festival Rotterdam 2005. Visions du Réel documentary film festival, Nyon, Switzerland 2005, One World Prague 2005, and Documenta Madrid 2005 where it received the special mention from the jury. In May 2005 he finished a 52 min version of the Patagonia research “Solitude at the end of the world”which received the special prize from the Jury in BAFICI Buenos Aires International Festival of Independent Cinema 2006. The Siberia project ”Hunters since the beginning of time” is the last chapter of a trilogy of films dedicated to the most extreme environments in the world. (Patagonia, Aral, Siberia) was awarded Best Documentary Award in FICCO Mexico International Film Festival 2008. In 2008 he published a selection of forbidden funk [Proibidão]Proibidao CV: Forbidden Gang Funk From Rio de Janeiro for the label Sublime Frequencies.  In 2007 he presented in different festivals in his latest work Tundra from the Siberian Fieldworks series, a live media project premiered at Netmage Festival in Bologna and Sonar. and was also presented in Multiplicidade in Rio de Janeiro.
In 2008 he founded together with fellow artist friend, Nico Vascellari Von Archives an audiovisual label publishing experimental audiovisual productions. Later in 2009 he created with partner and wife Saodat Ismailova, Map Productions, a production house dedicated to develop audiovisual projects around the world, from feature films, to documentaries.  In 2010 he presented his Cemetery Archive Works in Netmage and his End trilogy was presented for the first time in Cineteca Mexicana.  In June 2010 Hangar Bicocca in Milano presented END a comprehensive exhibition of the trilogy.
Avalanche (overture) his latest project is a collaboration with the American sound artist and minimalist legend Phill Niblock an ongoing project based in the Pamir mountains, in one of the world's highest inhabited villages. Avalanche (overture) superimposes Casas' footage over the overtones of "Stosspeng," a piece by Niblock. It is a visual-sonic journey, an extremely intense audiovisual meditation and a sensory experience in which extremes meet: nature in its rawest state and the pure, breathtaking and heady sound of drones. Presented for the first time in its first incarnation in Sonar Festival, Avalanche is an open film, reedited every time it is shown and adapted to the space it is presented Avalanche is an organic example of film-making, an ongoing document to the disappearance of this village, a reactive film within its community, Avalanche is alive together with the village, dying and born again every time it is presented. Avalanche is a lifelong project and site-specific film project based on one of Pamir highest inhabited village has been presented in different museums, festivals and gallery spaces around Europe and the USA. Cemetery his latest project is a take on the myth of the elephant cemetery. And has been awarded in FID Marseille, and presented in festivals all over the world.  He is co-founder of Map Productions and the visual sound label Von Archives. He is currently researching and working on a new project based on the eruption of the Krakatoa volcano in Indonesia.

Filmography
Cemetery (2019)
Avalanche (2010)
Hunters Since the Beginning of Time (2008)
Solitude at the End of the World (2005) 
Aral. Fishing in an Invisible Sea (2004) 
Rocinha. Daylight of a Favela (2003) 
Afterwords (2000)

Awards
Marseille Esperance Prize FIDMarseille 2019 (FID Marseille Festival International du Film) for Cemetery
Meta Cultural Foundation Award FIDMarseille 2019 (FID Marseille Festival International du Film) for Cemetery
High School Award FIDMarseille 2019 (FID Marseille Festival International du Film) for Cemetery
Best Documentary Award FICCO 2007 (Mexico International Film Festival) for Hunters since the beginning of time
Special Prize of the Jury BAFICI 2006 (Buenos Aires International Festival of Independent Cinema) for Solitude at the end of the world
Best Documentary Award Torino Film Festival 2004 for Aral. Fishing in an invisible sea
Special Prize of the Jury Documenta Madrid 2005 for Aral. Fishing in an Invisible Sea

Discography
Mutia (Matiere Memoire)
Pyramid of Skulls (Discrepant)
Vucca de lu puzzu (Canti Magnetici)
Patagonian Field Recordings (Musica Moderna)
Aral Field Recordings (Musica Moderna)
Siberian Field Recordings (Von Archives)

External links
Carlos Casas websiteCarlos Casas youtube ChannelCarlos Casas Vimeo channelCemetery at MUBICemetery Review The New York TimesCemetery Review The GuardianCemetery at Tate ModernCemetery at Fondation CartierCemetery Review InrockuptiblesCemetery Review CineuropaCemetery Review MUBICarlos Casas and Phill Niblock at NTU CCAAvalanche#18 at La TriennaleCarlos Casas The Wire interview The Wire magazineAvalanche at MAAT LisbonSanctuary at Tate ModernCarlos Casas END at Hangar BiccocaCarlos Casas at Hangar Bicocca Domus magazineCarlos Casas digicult interviewNetmage 2010 digicult interviewRecent ExhibitionsExibart Review Hunters since the beginning of time Review Solitude at the end of the worldSiberian Fieldworks at Galerie Davide Gallo BerlinCarlos Casas, Thomas Köner - Ways to Nowhere BLOGS&DOCS "Buscar los orígenes",Abitare Carlos Casas "Spazi di suono"

Galleries
angels barcelona
e/static, Turin
Galerie Davide Gallo in Berlin

References

1974 births
Living people
People from Barcelona
Spanish film directors